Launched as Kingfisher is an IMOCA 60 monohull sailing yacht, designed by Owen Clarke Design, Rob Humphreys and Giovanni Belgranno and constructed by Marten Marine in New Zealand.

Racing Results

Timeline

Kingfisher
The boat was commissioned by Offshore Challenges for Ellen for the 2000–2001 Vendée Globe.

Team 888

Team Cowes

Skandia

Safran

Educación Sin Fronteras

Fòrum Marítim Català

One Planet, One Ocean & Pharmaton

References

External links
 Didac Costa Sailing

Individual sailing yachts
2000s sailing yachts
Sailing yachts designed by Owen Clarke Design
Sailing yachts designed by Merfyn Owen
Sailing yachts designed by Allen Clarke
Sailboat type designs by Rob Humphreys
Sailboat type designs by Humphreys Yacht Design
Vendée Globe boats
IMOCA 60
Sailboat types built in New Zealand